Manturovo is the name of several inhabited localities in Russia.

Urban localities
Manturovo, Kostroma Oblast, a town in Kostroma Oblast

Rural localities
Manturovo, Ivanovo Oblast, a village in Zavolzhsky District of Ivanovo Oblast
Manturovo, Kursk Oblast, a selo in Manturovsky Selsoviet of Manturovsky District of Kursk Oblast
Manturovo, Ryazan Oblast, a village in Bagramovsky Rural Okrug of Rybnovsky District of Ryazan Oblast

References